Cosimo Aldo Cannone (born 20 March 1984) is a retired Italian Endurance S One racing driver and a two-time World Champion, who has been racing for Cannone.

Cosimo Aldo Cannone (Brindisi, March 20, 1984) is an Italian pilot boat, in the world of sport is also nicknamed  Alcan  (from "Aldo Cannone").

External links

  website UIM

1984 births
Living people
People from Brindisi
Italian motorboat racers
Sportspeople from the Province of Brindisi